On 28 December 2016, the Ajmer–Sealdah Express 12987, a scheduled train from Ajmer to Sealdah, derailed near Kanpur, India.

More than 60 people were injured. 

On 10 November,  from Kanpur, 14 coaches of the Indore-Patna Express had derailed, killing 151 people. Both accidents were thought to have been caused by fractured tracks. In January 2017, after deliberately damaged track was found in time to avoid a third derailment, three suspects arrested for placing a bomb on rail tracks near Ghorasahan, Motilal Paswan, Umashankar Patel and Mukesh Yadav, were implicated in the two Kanpur derailments. They admitted working for Inter-Services Intelligence of Pakistan. According to a police officer, although no evidence of explosives had been found in connection with the two Kanpur derailments, audio recovered from one of the suspects' cellphones suggested they were involved in them. Brij Kishore Giri, a Nepalese suspected of being the men's handler, was arrested in Nepal, as was Shamsul Huda, suspected of masterminding the plot, after he had been deported from Dubai.

References

2016 disasters in India
Railway accidents in 2016
Railway accidents and incidents in Uttar Pradesh
Kanpur Dehat district
Derailments in India
December 2016 events in India